Haplogroup E-P177 is a human Y-chromosome DNA haplogroup. E-P177 has two known subclades, which are haplogroup E-P2 and haplogroup E-P75.

Distribution

The Americas

E-P177 was not present in the Americas before European colonization.

Subclades

E-P2

Haplogroup E-P2 is a subclade of haplogroup E-P177.

E-P75

Haplogroup E-P75  is a subclade of haplogroup E-P177.

Phylogenetics

Phylogenetic history

Prior to 2002, there were in academic literature at least seven naming systems for the Y-Chromosome Phylogenetic tree. This led to considerable confusion. In 2002, the major research groups came together and formed the Y-Chromosome Consortium (YCC). They published a joint paper that created a single new tree that all agreed to use. Later, a group of citizen scientists with an interest in population genetics and genetic genealogy formed a working group to create an amateur tree aiming at being above all timely.  The table below brings together all of these works at the point of the landmark 2002 YCC Tree. This allows a researcher reviewing older published literature to quickly move between nomenclatures.

Research publications

The following research teams per their publications were represented in the creation of the YCC tree.

Phylogenetic trees

There are several confirmed and proposed phylogenetic trees available for haplogroup E-P177. The scientifically accepted one is the Y-Chromosome Consortium (YCC) one published in Karafet et al. (2008) and subsequently updated. A draft tree that shows emerging science is provided by Thomas Krahn at the Genomic Research Center in Houston, Texas. The International Society of Genetic Genealogy (ISOGG) also provides an amateur tree.

The Genomic Research Center draft tree

This is Thomas Krahn at the Genomic Research Center's Draft tree Proposed Tree for haplogroup E-P177. The first three levels of subclades are shown.

 E-P177 P177
 E1b1 P2, P179, P180, P181, DYS391p
 E-V38 L222.1, V38, V100
 E-M215 M215/Page40
 E-M329 M329
 E-P75 P75

The 2012 ISOGG tree

The subclades of Haplogroup E-P177 with their defining mutation(s), according to the 2012 ISOGG tree are provided below. The first three levels of subclades are shown.

 E-P177 P177
 E1b1 P2, P179, P180, P181, DYS391p
 E-V38 L222.1, V38, V100
 E-M215 M215/Page40
 E-P75 P75

See also

Genetics

Y-DNA E subclades

Y-DNA backbone tree

References

Sources for conversion tables

External links

 Y-DNA Haplogroup E and Its Subclades from ISOGG 2008 
 British Isles DNA Project

E

ca:Haplogrup E del cromosoma Y humà
de:Haplogruppe E (Y-DNA)
es:Haplogrupo E ADN-Y
fr:Haplogroupe E (Y-ADN)